Anthony Junior Lynch (born 20 January 1966) is an English former professional footballer who played as a left winger in the Football League for Brentford and Barnet. Either side of his spells with the two clubs, he played non-League football for Maidstone United, Wealdstone, Stevenage Borough, Kettering Town and Hendon.

Career
A left winger, Lynch began his career in the youth system at Brentford and while still an apprentice, he made four senior appearances during the 1983–84 season. He signed his first professional contract during the 1984 off-season, but made only 13 appearances during the 1984–85 season. The departure of a number of a number of players allowed Lynch to break into the first team during the 1985–86 season, in which he made 40 appearances and scored four goals. He was released by manager Frank McLintock in 1986 and dropped into non-League football.

After spells with Maidstone United and Wealdstone, Lynch joined Conference club Barnet in October 1990 and was a part of the team which was promoted to the Football League at the end of the 1990–91 season. He made 60 appearances and scored 12 goals for the club, before dropping back into non-League football to play for Stevenage Borough and Kettering Town. He made a reserve team appearance for Second Division strugglers Peterborough United in March 1997 and played the 1997–98 season with Isthmian League Premier Division club Hendon.

Honours 
Barnet
 Football Conference: 1990–91
Stevenage Borough
 Football Conference: 1995–96

Hendon

 Isthmian League Full Members Cup: 1997–98

Career statistics

References

External links 
 

1966 births
Living people
Footballers from Paddington
English footballers
Association football wingers
Brentford F.C. players
Maidstone United F.C. (1897) players
Wealdstone F.C. players
Barnet F.C. players
Stevenage F.C. players
Kettering Town F.C. players
English Football League players
Black British sportspeople
Isthmian League players
National League (English football) players
Hendon F.C. players